The 1964 National Invitation Tournament was the 1964 edition of the annual NCAA college basketball competition.

Selected teams
Below is a list of the 12 teams selected for the tournament.

 Army
 Bradley
 DePaul
 Drake
 Duquesne
 Miami (FL)
 New Mexico
 NYU
 Pittsburgh
 Saint Joseph's
 St. Bonaventure
 Syracuse

Bracket
Below is the tournament bracket.

See also
 1964 NCAA University Division basketball tournament
 1964 NCAA College Division basketball tournament
 1964 NAIA Division I men's basketball tournament

References

National Invitation
National Invitation Tournament
1960s in Manhattan
Basketball competitions in New York City
College sports in New York City
Madison Square Garden
National Invitation Tournament
National Invitation Tournament
Sports in Manhattan